Gelling, or Geling, is a village and the headquarters of an eponymous circle in the Upper Siang district in the Indian state of Arunachal Pradesh. The Brahmaputra River (called "Siang" in Arunachal Pradesh) enters India near Gelling.
Gelling village is located around 35 km upstream from Tuting.

The Gelling Circle contains the basin of the Siang river on both the sides, on the border of the Medog County of China's Tibet Autonomous Region. It has a population of 742 people living in six villages. The other villages in the Circle are Bishing, Bona, Kopu, Mayum and Norbudling. The Geling Circle along with the Singa Circle is organised as a community development block with 19 villages in total.

References

External links 
 Gelling Circle, OpenStreetMap, retrieved 19 January 2022.

Villages in Upper Siang district
Borders of Arunachal Pradesh
Upper Siang district